The fear of trains is an anxiety disorder, sometimes aggravated to the specific phobia level, associated with trains, railways, and railway travel.

Fear of Trains may also refer to:
"Fear of Trains",  a song from The Charm of the Highway Strip album by The Magnetic Fields
"Strah od vozova" (literally "fear of trains), a song from the Jahači magle album by Bajaga i Instruktori, also covered by other singers